Synneuron decipiens is a species of nematoceran flies in the family Canthyloscelidae.

References

Psychodomorpha
Articles created by Qbugbot
Insects described in 1977